The Toyota Sai is a hybrid electric car sharing the same platform and hybrid drivetrain as the Lexus HS. It was launched in Japan on October 20, 2009, following the launch of the Lexus HS in January of the same year. Toyota received about 14,000 orders in one month after its introduction, and the Sai is available at all Toyota Japanese dealership sales channels.

The Sai was released in December 2009 as Toyota's second hybrid-only line after the Prius as Toyota brand model. Positioned between the Prius and the Crown Hybrid, the Sai came in a semi-fastback 4-door sedan body with a trunk. It was a sister car of the Lexus HS 250h that was released earlier in July, and the two models shared the basic components although they were differentiated by their interior and exterior designs. The Sai's body length, width, and height were smaller than those of the Lexus HS 250h by 95 mm, 15 mm, and 10 mm, respectively.

The highly aerodynamic body design extended even to the flat and smooth underfloor covers, attaining a drag coefficient of 0.27 which was among the best in its class. Although the Sai employed the Toyota Hybrid System (THS) II with a reduction gear mechanism (the same as that of the Prius), its engine was a more powerful 2.4-liter unit (2AZ-FXE) producing 150 PS, to which a 143 PS motor was combined to drive the front wheels. The fuel consumption was 23.0 km/L under the 10-15 test cycle.

The name comes from the Japanese word "sai" -which means "talent" and "coloration" when written with the Kanji character.

On June 25, 2010, Lexus (Toyota) recalled 17,801 2010 model year HS250h and Sai models for failing to comply with US FMVSS 301, "Fuel System Integrity", due to the risk of excessive fuel leakage in the event of a rear-end collision. A recall of these Sai and HS models for reprogramming the brake software in February 2010 also led some buyers to question the model, with word of the issue possibly scaring away potential buyers.

On November 15, 2017, the Sai was discontinued and replaced by the Lexus ES 300h, which was released in Japan on October 24, 2018.

Gallery 
Pre-facelift

2013 facelift

References

External links
  

Sai
2010s cars 
Sedans 
Hybrid electric cars